Hundar may refer to:

Places
 Hundar, India, a village in the Leh district of Ladakh, India famous for sand dunes and Bactrian camels
 Hundar Dok, a village in the Leh district of Jammu and Kashmir, India
 Hondor, Lorestan, a village in Lorestan Province, Iran

People
Robert Hundar (1935–2008), Italian film actor and stage actor

See also
Hundur Monastery, also known as Hundur Gompa, Buddhist monastery in the Hundar village, in the Nubra Valley of Ladakh, northern India